Aspergillus allahabadii is a species of fungus in the genus Aspergillus. It is from the Terrei section. The species was first described in 1962. It has been reported to produce asperphenamate, atrovenetins, butyrolactones, citrinin, and gregatins.

Growth and morphology

A. allahabadii has been cultivated on both Czapek yeast extract agar (CYA) plates and Malt Extract Agar Oxoid® (MEAOX) plates. The growth morphology of the colonies can be seen in the pictures below.

References 

allahabadii
Fungi described in 1962